Evans Denver "Butch" Gibson (August 28, 1904 – May 1, 1960) was a professional American football defensive lineman in the National Football League. He played five seasons for the New York Giants (1930–1934). Gibson died from a result of a heart attack.

External links

1904 births
1960 deaths
Grove City College alumni
People from Stark County, Ohio
Players of American football from Ohio
American football defensive tackles
New York Giants players